Jill A. Davis (born 1966) is an American author and television writer. She is a member of  the Writers Guild of America. She was nominated for five Emmy awards for her six years of work as a writer for David Letterman. Her first novel, Girls' Poker Night (published by Random House in 2002), was a New York Times bestseller. It was published in five languages, and twelve countries. Her second novel, Ask Again Later, was published by Ecco in February 2007.

Biography
Davis, originally from Berks County, Pennsylvania, is a graduate of Endicott College and Emerson College, majoring in creative writing. She holds an MFA in Fiction from NYU  and has an honorary Ph.D. in Arts & Letters from Endicott.

Prior to working in television, Davis was a newspaper reporter and columnist. After leaving the Late Show with David Letterman, she created and executive-produced a television show pilot for DreamWorks starring Tracy Pollan, Anna Says. She also wrote and published a number of screenplays, teleplays, short stories and magazine articles.

She is married to Edward Conard and lives in New York City with her husband and daughter.

Works

Novels

Collections/humor 
 1996 David Letterman’s New Book of Top Ten Lists and Wedding Dress Patterns for the Husky Brideby David Letterman, Steve O'Donnell, et al. 
 1995 David Letterman’s Book of Top Ten Lists and Zest Lo-Cal Chicken Recipesby David Letterman, Steve O'Donnell, et al. 
 1996 Home Cookin’ with Dave’s Momby David Letterman, foreword by David Letterman and Jill Davis.

Short stories 
 2004 "New York" (in Girls' Night In, ed. Lauren Henderson, Chris Manby, Sarah Mlynowski)
 2004 "Sister Goddess Ruby" (in May Contain Nuts: A Very Loose Canon of American Humor, ed. Michael J. Rosen)

Television and film 
 2000 Drinking, Smoking, Fooling Around, a collection of short stories adapted as monologues (HBO Productions) (writer)
 1999 Mother's Helper, teleplay (Blue Relief, Inc.; Bob Kosberg Productions & Touchstone Pictures)  (writer)
 1999 Anna Says, sitcom pilot (Dreamworks Television and Lottery Hill Entertainment) (creator, writer, executive producer)
 1998 The Group, sitcom (Blue Relief, Inc.) (creator, writer, executive producer)
 1996 The Late Show with David Letterman: Video Special II (CBS) (writer)
 1995 The Late Show with David Letterman: Video Special (CBS) (writer)
 1993-1996 The Late Show with David Letterman (CBS) (writer)
 1992 The Late Show with David Letterman: Tenth Anniversary Special (NBC) (writer)
 1991-1993 The Late Show with David Letterman (NBC) (writer)
 Half Magic, film (Nickelodeon Films) (writer)

Articles 

 "The Reason You're Still Single: Commitmentphobia Isn't Just a Guy Thing" (Cosmopolitan, Sept. 1 2002)
 The Countdown (serialized novella later developed as Ask Again Later, USA Today Open Book, 2008)
 "The North Shore's Literary Treasure, John Updike" (North Shore Life, August–September 1987, Vol VII, No. 4)

References

External links
 www.harpercollins.com Author bio
 Official website  

American women writers
1966 births
Living people
Writers from Reading, Pennsylvania
Writers from New York City
Endicott College alumni
Emerson College alumni
New York University alumni
21st-century American women